The Norwegian railway network consists of  of electrified railway lines, constituting 62% of the Norwegian National Rail Administration's  of line. The first three mainline systems to be electrified were private ore-hauling lines. The Thamshavn Line opened in 1909, and remained in revenue use until 1973, after which it was converted to a heritage railway. It is the world's oldest remaining alternating-current railway and the only narrow gauge railway in the country to have been electrified. It was followed by Norsk Transport's Rjukan and Tinnoset Lines two years later, and Sydvaranger's Kirkenes–Bjørnevatn Line in 1922. The Norwegian State Railways' (NSB) first electrification was parts of the Drammen Line in 1922 and the ore-hauling Ofoten Line, which connects to the Iron Ore Line in Sweden, in 1923. The use of El 1 locomotives on the Drammen Line proved a large cost-saver over steam locomotives, and NSB started electrifying other lines around Oslo; from 1927 to 1930, the remainder of the Drammen Line and the continuation along the Randsfjorden and Sørlandet Lines to Kongsvinger were converted, along with the first section of the Trunk Line. In 1935, the Hardanger Line became the first section of new NSB track to be electrified. From 1936 to 1940, NSB electrified the Østfold Line, as well as more of the Sørland Line and the Bratsberg Line, connecting all electric lines west of Oslo.

During the 1940s, NSB electrified the Sørland Line, although the final section from Egersund to Stavanger was not converted until 1956. In 1957, the Kirkenes–Bjørnevatn Line became the only line to remove the electrification and replace the electric locomotives with diesel power. The 1950s saw the electrification of several regional and commuter lines around Oslo, including the Kongsvinger Line, the Trunk Line and the Dovre Line from Lillestrøm to Hamar, the Vestfold Line and the Eastern Østfold Line. This was largely due to NSB's program to remove all steam locomotives, either by electrification or by dieselization. In the late 1950s and 1960s, several to-be electrified lines were operated with diesel locomotives as an interim solution. The 1960s saw the remaining two steam lines in Southern Norway, the Bergen and Dovre Lines, electrified along with the Gjøvik Line. The Bergen Line was completed in 1964 and the Dovre Line completed in 1970. This finished all the planned electrifications, and the authorities deemed the remaining lines unprofitable to electrify because of low traffic. During the 1990s, a new program was attempted, this time to electrify the entire network, but only the Arendal Line was converted before the program was canceled. However, new lines around Oslo, including the Lieråsen and Oslo Tunnels on the Drammen Line and the Gardermoen and Asker Lines, were electrified at the time they opened. Further plans have been launched, in particular the section of the Nordland Line from Trondheim to Steinkjer, which is part of the Trøndelag Commuter Rail, and the Meråker Line, which connects to the electrified Central Line in Sweden.

In 2008, electric traction accounted for 90% of the passenger kilometers, 93% of the tonne kilometers and 74% of the energy consumption of all trains running in Norway, with the rest being accounted for by diesel traction. Technology for electric railways was demonstrated in Germany in 1879; the first revenue line took electric traction into use in 1881. The first electric industrial railway in Norway opened in 1892 at Skotfos Bruk near Skien. Two years later, parts of the Oslo Tramway were electrified. The first alternating current (AC) line became operational in 1892, while the first line to use a single-phase, single overhead wire power supply opened in Germany in 1903. In 1912, all German railways agreed to use the  standard, which was later adopted first by Sweden and then by NSB. Several of the private lines that preceded NSB's electrification chose different standards. Sydvaranger chose to install the only mainline direct current (DC) and third rail system.



Timeline

The following list contains a chronology of when the various sections of mainline railway lines were electrified. The list excludes industrial and short branch lines, as well as systems installed at ports and yards. The list contains the date when the electrification was taken into regular use on each section. It also notes if a section was opened as an electric railway, and if the line was prepared as an electric line, but where this was not taken into use immediately. The list contains the line and section to be electrified, and its length. The length indicates the length of the mainline section at the time of electrification. Due to changes of routes and shortening of lines, the current length of sections may be shorter. The sixth column shows the electrification system, including voltage and frequency in case of AC and no frequency in case of DC.

Notes and references

Notes

References

Bibliography

Electrification timeline
Railway electrification in Norway
Rail transport timelines